Symbiosis was a 70 mm documentary shown from October 1982 to January 1995 in the Harvest Theater at The Land pavilion at Epcot at the Walt Disney World Resort in Lake Buena Vista, Florida. It was directed by Paul Gerber and narrated by veteran voice-actor Philip L. Clarke.

The movie focused on the balance between technological expansion and the protection of the environment.  The film showed environmental damage caused by humans and what is being done to fix the damage created.

The film was projected on a 23x60 foot screen, and used a 13-track digital sound system.

It closed on January 1, 1995, and was replaced by Circle of Life: An Environmental Fable.  The new film featured some re-edited footage from Symbiosis.

The film has since been shown at film festivals specialising in the 70 mm film format; at the National Media Museum in 1998, and in Karlsruhe, Germany in 2012.

See also
Epcot attraction and entertainment history

References

External links

1982 films
Documentary films about environmental issues
Former Walt Disney Parks and Resorts attractions
Epcot
Walt Disney Parks and Resorts films
Amusement rides introduced in 1982
1982 establishments in Florida
1995 disestablishments in Florida